People's Court may refer to:

East Asia
 Supreme People's Court, the highest court of the People's Republic of China
 Local people's courts of the People's Republic of China
 Local Courts of Vietnam, also known as People's Courts, which deal with legal issues at the district precinct levels

Eastern Europe
 People's Court (Soviet Union), a civil court of the Soviet Union
 People's Court (Bulgaria), a temporary Fatherland Front–established court in Bulgaria active in 1944–1945

Germany
 People's Court (Germany), a court established by Adolf Hitler to deal with those accused of political offences
 People's Court (Bavaria), a Bavarian court from 1918 to 1924, that tried, among others, Adolf Hitler and other Beer Hall Putsch conspirators

North Africa
 Libyan People's Court, an emergency tribunal founded in Libya after the political change of 1 September 1969, to try officials of the Kingdom era

Entertainment
 The People's Court, the first widely popular American "court show" in which actual small claims court cases were heard by a pseudo-judicial arbitrator
 La Corte del Pueblo, the Spanish-language version of The People's Court that aired on the Telemundo network

See also
 Supreme People's Court (disambiguation)
 Court of public opinion
 Kangaroo court
 People’s Tribunal (disambiguation)